was a Japanese politician, a member of the National Diet and a Cabinet member.

Biography 
He was born in Kobayashi, Miyazaki. He graduated from Kagoshima Prefectural Daini-Kagoshima Middle School (now Kagoshima Prefectural Konan High School) in 1923 and from Third Higher School (now Kyoto University) in 1926. 

In 1929, he graduated from Faculty of Law, Tokyo Imperial University (now University of Tokyo) and joined Mitsubishi Bank. Later, he served as the committee chairs of Mitsubishi Bank Employees' Union.

He was first elected to a member of the House of Representatives in 1949 and was elected 12 times. He served as Minister of Construction in the Cabinets of Hayato Ikeda and Eisaku Satō, Director General of Environment Agency in the Cabinet of Kakuei Tanaka, the chief of Judge Impeachment Court, and the Chairs of Committee on Agriculture, Forestry and Fisheries and Committee on Budget of the House of Representatives. He received the Grand Cordons of the Order of the Rising Sun in 1976.

References 

1905 births
1988 deaths
People from Miyazaki Prefecture
University of Tokyo alumni
Members of the House of Representatives (Japan)
Ministers of Construction of Japan
Liberal Democratic Party (Japan) politicians
20th-century Japanese politicians
Politicians from Miyazaki Prefecture
Grand Cordons of the Order of the Rising Sun